Yagodninsky District is an administrative and municipal district (raion), one of the eight in Magadan Oblast, Russia. It is located in the western central part of the oblast. Its administrative center is the urban locality (an urban-type settlement) of Yagodnoye. Population:  15,833 (2002 Census);  The population of Yagodnoye accounts for 42.8% of the district's total population.

Geography
The district borders with Susumansky District in the north, Srednekansky District in the east, Khasynsky District in the south, and with Tenkinsky District in the west. There are a number of abandoned villages in the district, such as Taskan, Elgen and Ust-Taskan.

The most important rivers of the district are the Kolyma, Debin, Orotukan, Taskan, Bakhapcha and Kongo.

See also
Kolyma Reservoir

References

Notes

Sources

Districts of Magadan Oblast